Gabriel da Silva Dias (born 17 December 1980 in Pelotas), commonly known as Gabriel, is a Brazilian futsal player who played for Barcelona] and Movistar Inter[Interviu as a Flank.

Honours
2 FIFA World Championships (2008, 2012)
2 División de Honor(04/05, 07/08)
2 Copas de España (06/07, 08/09)
3 Supercopas de España (05/06, 07/08, 08/09)
2 UEFA Futsal Cup (2006, 2009,2014)
6 Intercontinental Cup (2001, 2004, 2005, 2006, 2007, 2008)
1 Recopa de Europa (2008)
1 Copa Ibérica (05/06)
2 Liga Futsal (2001, 2004)
3 Ligas Estatales (1999, 2002, 2004)
1 Copa Brasil (2001)
2 South American Club Futsal Championship (2002, 2003)
2 Supercopa de América (2002, 2003)
1 Pan American Games Champion (2007)
2 Campeonatos Sudamericanos (2006, 2008)
1 Grand Prix (2009)

References

External links
lnfs.es

1980 births
Living people
Brazilian men's futsal players
Futsal players at the 2007 Pan American Games
Inter FS players
FC Barcelona Futsal players
People from Pelotas
Sportspeople from Rio Grande do Sul
Pan American Games gold medalists for Brazil
Pan American Games medalists in futsal
Medalists at the 2007 Pan American Games